Sree Narayana Guru College (SNGC), is a college in the city of Coimbatore, Tamil Nadu, India.

References
 Official website

Universities and colleges in Coimbatore
Narayana Guru
Sree Narayana College, Kollam